Life and death is a fundamental concept in the game of Go.

Life and death may also refer to:
Life and Death, opposite conditions that distinguish organisms from inorganic objects, i.e. non-life

Music
Life and Death (album), a 2014 album by Confession
"Life and Death", a song by Iced Earth	from their 1990	album, Iced Earth
"Life and Death", a song by Screaming Jets from their 1994 album, The Screaming Jets
"Life and Death", a song by Terror from their 2003 album, Lowest of the Low

Film and television
Life and Death (1943 film), a Swedish drama film
Life and Death (1980 film), a Norwegian film
"Life and Death" (Dynasty), an episode of the TV series Dynasty

Other uses
Life & Death, a computer game released in 1988
Life and Death: Unapologetic Writings on the Continuing War on Women, a 1997 book by Andrea Dworkin
Life and Death: Twilight Reimagined, by Stephenie Meyer (2015)
Life and Death, a story arc in The Walking Dead comic series

See also
 A Matter of Life and Death (disambiguation)
 Circle of life (disambiguation)